The extinct Palta language of the Ecuadorian Amazon is attested by only a few words: yumé 'water', xeme 'maize', capal 'fire', let 'wood' (Jiménez de la Espada, 1586), and some toponyms. Based on this, Jacinto Jijón y Caamaño (1936) classified it as a Jivaroan language. Kaufman (1994) states that there is "little resemblance", but Adelaar (2004) finds the connection reasonable. In addition to these four words are toponyms, which commonly end in -anga, -numa, -namá. The latter two suggest the Jivaroan locative case suffix -num ~ -nam, and Torero (1993) notes that the last resembles Aguaruna (Jivaroan) namák(a) 'river' as well.

Mason (1950) also lists Malacata as an alternate name for Palta.

Bibliography
 Jiménez de la Espada, Marcos, ed. (1965 [1586]): Relaciones geográficas de Indias: Perú, 3 vols. Biblioteca de Autores Españoles 183–5. Madrid: Atlas.
 Jijón y Caamaño, Jacinto (1936–8): Sebastián de Benalcázar, vol. 1 (1936) Quito: Imprenta del Clero; vol. 2 (1938) Quito: Editorial Ecuatoriana.
 Jijón y Caamaño, Jacinto (1940–5): El Ecuador interandino y occidental antes de la conquista castellana, vol. 1 (1940), vol. 2 (1941), vol. 3 (1943), vol. 4 (1945). Quito: Editorial Ecuatoriana (1998 edition, Quito: Abya-Yala).

References

Indigenous languages of Western Amazonia
Languages of Ecuador
Languages of Peru
Extinct languages of South America
Unclassified languages of South America